The Multani Lohar are a Muslim community found in the state of Gujarat in India.

History and origin 
The community claims to be Rajputs who converted to Islam. They were originally settled in the city of Multan, and were brought to Jodhpur by its ruler to manufacture cannonballs. Over time, these Multani Lohars immigrated to Gujarat. Their dialect of Gujarati still contains substantial Seraiki loanwords. The community claims to be distinct from the other Lohar communities of Gujarat on account of its Rajput ancestry.

Present circumstances 

The community's traditional occupation was that of blacksmithy, but as with other artisan groups, they have seen a decline of their traditional occupation. Many now earn their living as day labourers. Like other Gujarati Muslim groups, they have a caste council, the Multani Lohar Jamat, which is responsible for the welfare of the community. They are a strictly endogamous community, and practice gotra exogamy. All their clans have equal status, and intermarry.

See also 
 Nagori

References 

Muslim communities of India
Muslim communities of Gujarat
Social groups of Gujarat
History of Multan